Night of the Crime is the second album by the heavy metal band Icon. It was far more polished than their self-titled debut and forayed into areas of glam only previously alluded to on their debut. It was produced and engineered by Eddie Kramer. Around 30 songs were demoed for the album, and Kramer´s version included one more finished track, "Hang Tough" (later covered by Pretty Maids). Ron Nevison mixed the album and "Hang Tough" did not make it to the final release. The album has, like the debut, been remastered and re-released several times on CD. Night of the Crime was voted third best AOR album of all time by Kerrang! magazine readers in 1988, behind multimillion-selling classic albums by Journey and Michael Bolton.

Track list 
Side one
 "Naked Eyes" (Bob Halligan Jr., John Aquilino) – 4:04
 "Missing" (Halligan Jr.) – 4:30
 "Danger Calling" (Halligan Jr., Dan Wexler) – 3:39
 "(Take Another) Shot at My Heart" (Wexler, Stephen Clifford) – 3:23
 "Out for Blood" (Wexler, Aquilino) – 5:40

Side two
"Raise the Hammer" (Halligan Jr.) – 3:33
 "Frozen Tears" (Halligan Jr.) – 4:00
 "Whites of Their Eyes" (Halligan Jr., Wexler) – 3:43
 "Hungry for Love" (Wexler, Clifford) – 4:17
 "Rock My Radio" (Wexler, Clifford, Mike Varney) – 4:14

Personnel 
Icon
 Stephen Clifford – vocals, backing vocals
 Dan Wexler – guitars
 John Aquilino – guitars
 Tracy Wallach – bass, backing vocals
 Pat Dixon – drums, percussion

Production
 Eddie Kramer – producer for Remarkable Productions Inc., engineer
 Mark McKenna – engineer
 Bill Scheniman – additional engineer
Chris Isca – additional engineer
Steve Escallier – additional engineer
 Ron Nevison – mixing at The Record Plant, Los Angeles, CA
 Dan Wexler – mixing assistant
Mike Clink – mixing assistant
 Mike Reese – mastering
 Tom Muller – CD mastering
 Stan Watts – illustrations
 Klee Shea – design
 Karen Filter – photography
Norman Seeff – photography
 Volker Kurze – reissue producer for ATM Records

References 

Icon (band) albums
1985 albums
Albums produced by Eddie Kramer
Capitol Records albums